Pyramid Mountain can refer to:

Antarctica
Pyramid Mountain (Antarctica), in the Quartermain Mountains

Canada
Pyramid Mountain (Alberta) in Jasper National Park, Alberta
Pyramid Mountain (Garibaldi Provincial Park) in Garibaldi Provincial Park, British Columbia
Pyramid Mountain (Wells Gray-Clearwater) in Wells Gray-Clearwater Volcanic Field of British Columbia

United States
Pyramid Mountain (Kodiak Island), Alaska
Pyramid Mountains, New Mexico
Pyramid Mountain (Clallam County, Washington) in Olympic National Park
Pyramid Mountain (Montana), in the Beartooth Mountains

See also
 Pyramid Peak (disambiguation)